Dogmeat is a recurring dog non-player character (NPC) in the Fallout series of post-apocalyptic themed role-playing video games. Dogmeat was introduced as an optional companion to the player character in the original Fallout (1997), and has made cameo appearances in the sequel Fallout 2 (1998). Other, different Dogmeats are featured in the same role in Fallout 3 (2008) and Fallout 4 (2015). All incarnations of the character were well received, becoming widely regarded as one of the best remembered features in the series, as well as one of the most popular sidekick characters in video gaming overall.

Character design

Dogmeat was inspired by the unnamed dog of Max Rockatansky (Mad Max) from the 1981 post-apocalyptic film Mad Max 2. His initial name had been "Dogshit" and his ultimate name was derived from the opening scene of the 1975 post-apocalyptic film A Boy and His Dog, in which the main character Vic calls his dog Blood "Dogmeat". According to Fallout producer, lead programmer and designer Tim Cain, "Leonard Boyarsky, the [game's] art director ... had that movie running continuously in his office, and I think he remarked on several occasions that having a dog in the game would be really cool. [It's] why we wanted a dog in the first place." Fallout programmer and designer Jesse Heinig was credited by Cain as probably "one person to thank for Dogmeat." Heinig himself said: "My understanding is that [Fallout designer] Scott Bennie settled on the name 'Dogmeat' for the character, and it's likely that he did pick that from the story in question."

In 2009, Fallout designer Chris Taylor said they "never expected that Dogmeat would become such a popular character." Taylor said: "I always intended that the various NPCs that joined up with the player would come to a violent end. I was shocked when I heard of all the work people went through to keep Dogmeat alive to the end – especially the hell that they went through with the force fields in the Military Base." According to Fallout 2 and Fallout: New Vegas designer Chris Avellone, Dogmeat is "arguably the most successful NPC companion ever" for several reasons: "One, he doesn't talk, so the players can project a personality on to him. Two, he's effective in combat ... and three, he's a dog that stays with you through thick-and-thin. I don't think there's a deeper 'awww' sentiment than people have in their hearts for their pets."

In Fallout 4, Dogmeat's motion capture was done by a German Shepherd named River. On June 27, 2021, Fallout 4s senior game designer Joel Burgess confirmed via Twitter that River had died. On July 7, 2021, Bethesda Softworks and Xbox donated $10,000 to the Humane society in honor of Dogmeat.

Appearances
In the original Fallout by Black Isle Studios and Interplay Entertainment, the protagonist player character, the Vault Dweller, first encounters the stray Dogmeat in Junktown. Dogmeat's former owner (an unnamed man closely resembling Max Rockatansky) died at the hands of thugs hired by a local gangster named Gizmo. If the player character feeds Dogmeat or is wearing a leather jacket, Dogmeat will follow them and fight in their defense. According to the series' canon, Dogmeat was adopted by the Vault Dweller on 30 December 2161, and killed by a force field barrier during the Vault Dweller's assault on the Master's Military Base on 20 April 2162. Dogmeat was supposed to appear in the canceled film adaptation of the game as well.

In Fallout 2, Dogmeat makes a non-canonical appearance in an Easter egg type special encounter "Café of Broken Dreams". During the encounter, Dogmeat can be picked up by the player character, the Chosen One, if the player approaches him wearing Vault 13 jumpsuit (or the Bridgekeeper's robes, due to a bug in the game). If the player chooses to kill Dogmeat, a man named Mel (in a reference to Mel Gibson, the actor who played Mad Max in the film) will appear and try to avenge him. Dogmeat has made uncredited cameo appearances outside of the Fallout universe in Troika Games' 2001 Arcanum: Of Steamworks and Magick Obscura (created by Fallout designer Tim Cain) and in 2004 The Bard's Tale by inXile Entertainment (headed by Fallout producer Brian Fargo). However, there were no plans to bring back Dogmeat for the original third Fallout game project by Black Isle Studios, the canceled Van Buren.

An entirely different dog named Dogmeat appears in Fallout 3 by Bethesda Softworks, which begins in the year 2277. His master, a scavenger, was killed by a band of raiders in the scrapyard where the dog is to be found. Dogmeat can be recruited by Fallout 3s player character, the Lone Wanderer. The dog can find objects of value across the landscape and bring them to the player. Fallout 3 expansion set Broken Steel optionally (enabled by choosing the 'perk' bonus "Puppies!" after reaching 22nd experience level) allows a killed Dogmeat to be replaced by a new one (with twice as many hit points, that is a starting value of 1,000 instead of 500) whenever he dies during the game. A fanmade mod, which provides an armor for Dogmeat, was compared by Destructoid to the infamous horse armor DLC from Bethesda's The Elder Scrolls IV: Oblivion, "except free and functional".

A new version of Dogmeat appears in Fallout 4. In this game, Dogmeat is a German Shepherd, and can not die. Dogmeat also appears in Fallout Shelter.

Reception

Dogmeat's character was very well received by gaming media. Owen Good of Kotaku called Dogmeat "one of the franchise's most iconic characters" as well as its "one of the most [e]motionally fulfilling features." The book Level Up!: The Guide to Great Video Game Design by Scott Rogers used him as an example while discussing how the "party members don't need to be human". In 2008, UGO Team stated this "undisputed champion of Fallout characters" is not "only our favorite Fallout character, he's also one of gaming's greatest dogs." That same year, Joe Martin of Bit-tech ranked Dogmeat as the sixth top PC game NPC of all time, commenting: "There are a lot of computer game characters we like and a few we'd even go so far as to say we love. Dogmeat though, despite being a definite tabula rasa, sits in a different category altogether and is the only computer game character that we'd reload and repeat significant portions of a game for, just so he could stand a better chance of survival." In 2009, Michael Fiegel of The Escapist called Dogmeat possibly the most beloved character of the Fallout universe, writing that "in an uncaring wasteland ... Dogmeat is a moral compass: Though your needle might swing towards good or evil, his center always holds strong provided you protect him." Dogmeat was included in numerous lists of best video game dogs, including by Lisa Foiles of The Escapist in 2010, Michael Perry of PlayStation Official Magazine in 2012, Gergo Vas of Kotaku in 2013, and Brian Taylor of Paste, and the staff of Bild in 2014. Ryan McCaffrey of IGN chose Dogmeat as the top feature he wished to return in Fallout 4.

Dogmeat was also acclaimed by numerous publications as one of the best sidekick type characters in video games. He was included at GameSpot on their list of the top ten video game sidekicks in 2000, chosen for his loyalty to his master in spite of his "propensity to get himself into trouble, his inability to perform any tricks, and his refusal to listen to directions" in the original game. This "loyal companion" was also chosen by GameSpot to be one of the 64 characters to compete in the 2008 poll for the title of "All-Time Greatest Game Sidekick". In 2004, Dogmeat placed as second on Dave Kosak of GameSpy as his list of the best video game sidekicks, also because of his extreme faithfulness to the player's character. In 2008, The Telegraph featured him as one of top ten greatest sidekicks in gaming history. In 2011, Maximum PC included Dogmeat among the 25 of gaming's greatest sidekicks, commenting that "though his look, his breed, and his stats have varied [through the series], Dogmeat has the loyalty and heart of a champion." While David Lozada of GameRevolution has also included him on his "The best video game sidekicks ever", and stated that "Dogmeat is a recurring character in the Fallout franchise for good reason. This companion will attack anything or anyone on command, no matter how large or menacing the enemy may look." Matthew Byrd of Den of Geek included Dogmeat and placed as 9th of their "best video games npcs ever", stating that "Not only is this companion one of the most consistent sights in the Fallout universe, but their status as the absolute goodest boy/girl is undeniable." In 2021, Lauren Rouse of Kotaku included Dogmeat as her "best animal companions that are the real mvps of video games", and further stated that "he can fetch, he can attack, he can be dressed up in crazy costumes and he will love you unconditionally." Rachel Weber of GamesRadar ranked Dogmeat as 39th of their "50 iconic video game characters," while PC Gamer ranked Dogmeat as 29th of "the 50 most iconic characters in PC gaming," stating that "Fallouts Dogmeat is both the most famous and most long-standing, having appeared in one form or another in every mainline Fallout Game since 1996, the latest of which lets you dress him up".

River, the dog who portrayed Dogmeat in Fallout 4, was awarded "Top Video Game Dog of 2015" at The CW's World Dog Awards. In 2018, A Dogmeat statue has been made.

See also
Epona (The Legend of Zelda)

References

External links
Dogmeat at The Vault, the Fallout wiki

Adoptee characters in video games
Animal characters in video games
Bethesda characters
Fallout (series)
Fictional characters with heterochromia
Fictional dogs
Male characters in video games
Video game characters introduced in 1997
Video game sidekicks